Goodrich School District or Goodrich Public Schools may refer to:
 Goodrich Area Schools (Michigan)
 Goodrich Public School District 16 (North Dakota)
 Goodrich Independent School District (Texas)